Dalla octomaculata, the eight-spotted skipper or light-spotted skipper, is a species of butterfly in the family Hesperiidae, in the subfamily Heteropterinae, which are sometimes called skipperlings. It is found in Costa Rica and Panama.

References

Sources

Butterflies described in 1900
octomaculata
Taxa named by Frederick DuCane Godman
Taxonomy articles created by Polbot